The Uchraspred was the  Registration and Distribution Department of the Central Committee of the Communist Party of the Soviet Union. It was founded in 1920 as a department in the Russian Communist Party responsible for registering the members and assigning them to different tasks. However, the appointments to the highest party positions still came under the jurisdiction of the Orgburo. In 1922, the Uchraspred made over ten thousand assignments.  In 1924, the Uchraspred was merged with the Orgburo, forming the Orgraspred.

References
Thomas Streissguth. The Rise of the Soviet Union. (Greenhaven Press, 2001)

Bodies of the Communist Party of the Soviet Union
1920 establishments in Russia
Soviet phraseology